Vincenzo Russo (18 April 1924 – 25 February 2005) was an Italian politician.

Russo was born in Foggia on 18 April 1924, and earned degrees in physics and mathematics. He sat on the Chamber of Deputies from 1958 to 1992, until he was elected to the Senate, on which he served until 1994. Russo died on 25 February 2005.

References

1924 births
2005 deaths
People from Foggia
Christian Democracy (Italy) members of the Chamber of Deputies (Italy)
Deputies of Legislature III of Italy
Deputies of Legislature IV of Italy
Deputies of Legislature V of Italy
Deputies of Legislature VI of Italy
Deputies of Legislature VII of Italy
Deputies of Legislature VIII of Italy
Deputies of Legislature IX of Italy
Deputies of Legislature X of Italy
Senators of Legislature XI of Italy